Magdalena van den Hecken (1615, possibly in Antwerp – after 1635) was a Dutch Golden Age flower painter from the Northern Netherlands.

Biography

Early life 
Van den Hecken may have been born in Antwerp. She is the daughter of the painter Samuel van den Hecken and moved with her family to Amsterdam.

Education 
Magadalena's father joined the Antwerp Guild of Saint Luke in 1617 as a master painter.

Paintings 
Magdalena mostly painted flowers, which were in the medium of oil paint. She also painted in insects and animals.

Legacy 
Several of Magdalena's works are located at the Fitzwilliam Museum, in Cambridge, two in the Kunsthaus Zürich.

References

External links
Magdalena van den Hecken in 1001 Vrouwen
 

1615 births
17th-century deaths
Artists from Antwerp
Dutch Golden Age painters
Dutch women painters